George Wallace Kenner FRS (16 November 1922 – 26 June 1978) was a British organic chemist. He was born in Sheffield in 1922, the son of Prof. James Kenner. During his childhood, he went to Didsbury Preparatory School in 1928 and moved to Manchester Grammar School in 1934. He was appointed to the first Heath Harrison Chair of Organic Chemistry at the University of Liverpool 1957–1976. He did his MSc and PhD degrees under Lord Todd at Manchester and Cambridge Universities in UK. He married Jillian Bird in 1951 and they had two daughters both born in Cambridge. He was faculty member at the Cambridge University for 15 years before moving to the University of Liverpool in 1957 as Heath Harrison Professor of Organic Chemistry.

Achievements 
George Kenner contributed to many areas of organic chemistry. In the 1960s, George Kenner, R.A. Gregory and Hilda Tracy were involved in the seminal discovery and synthesis of the peptide hormone gastrin at the University of Liverpool. Gastrin is involved in secretion of gastric acid (HCl) in the stomach.

The first chemical synthesis of a lysozyme-like enzyme of 129 amino acids using classical approach was attempted by Kenner and his group at the University of Liverpool in 1970s. This was the largest protein synthesised in the laboratory using the classical peptide synthesis up to that time. He carefully planned synthesis of this lysozyme analogue, of proven purity, containing 129 amino acid residues joined in a rigorously defined order. His effort led to the synthesis of this 129 amino acid protein. His dream of making a wholly synthetic lysozyme was only achieved in 2007. The synthesis of functionally active lysozyme was done 30 years later by Steve B. Kent and his group at the University of Chicago. The value of George Kenner's contributions to the methodology of peptide chemistry had profoundly influence on the developments in many biomedicine fields. For example it led to the synthesis of antigens of defined geometry for immunological studies.

Kenner's work has been recognised by the awards of the Meldola Medal (1951) and the Corday-Morgan Medal (1957) and in distinguished lectureships such as Tilden (1955), Simonsen (1972) and Pedler (1976) of the Chemical Society of whose Perkin Division he was President from 1974 to 1976. He was also President of Section B of the British Association for the Advancement of Science in 1974. Elected a Fellow of the Royal Society in 1964 he was the Society's Bakerian Lecturer for 1976 and was elected to a Royal Society Research Professorship in 1976.

The Kenner Prize and Awards at University of Liverpool 
George Kenner Prize and Lectureship was established in 1979 with a sum of £12,000 raised by subscription to commemorate the late Professor GW Kenner, Heath Harrison Professor of Organic Chemistry from 1957 to 1976 and Royal Society Professor from 1977 to 1978. The duty of the Lectureship recipient is to deliver lectures on subjects related to the study of Organic Chemistry at the University. Several famous organic chemists were awarded this honour and these include Gilbert Stork, Ryoji Noyori, Steven V. Ley, Albert Eschenmoser, John George Adami, Duilio Arigoni, and Jean-Marie Lehn. The George W. Kenner Award for graduate students was established in 2006 to commemorate Kenner who spent almost 21 years in the Chemistry department at the University of Liverpool as the Heath Harrison Professor of Organic Chemistry. The award is annually given to the first-year PhD student in the organic section of the Department of Chemistry who is the best in both academic and research performance.

References 

English chemists
Organic chemists
Fellows of the Royal Society
1922 births
1978 deaths
People educated at Manchester Grammar School
Alumni of the University of Manchester
Alumni of Christ's College, Cambridge
Fellows of Trinity Hall, Cambridge
Academics of the University of Liverpool
People from Didsbury